Prince Varananda Dhavaj, born Prince Varananda Dhavaj Chudadhuj (19 August 1920 – 14 September 1990) was the son of Prince Chudadhuj Dharadilok and Mom Ravi Kayananda. Although he was the only son of a senior Thai prince, he was disqualified from succession to the throne because his mother was not Prince Chudadhut's formal wife.

Following the death of his father, the prince was raised by his uncle King Prajadhipok. He joined the monarch in virtual exile in England. He enlisted in the RAF on 24 February 1942 under the name Nicky Varanand, was commissioned in 1943, and served as pilot in the Normandy campaign during World War II. He remained in the RAF, finally retiring as a flight lieutenant in 1960 to fly commercial aircraft for Thai Airways International. He later created his own airline, Air Siam, which went bankrupt in 1977. In 1973, he also became an adviser to the Ministry of Agriculture.

Marriage and family
He married Mom Pamela Smee on 10 June 1950. Two children were born from this union:
 Mom Rajawongse Dilok Nicholas Chudadhuj (1953), Married with Jane Bishop and Chulalaxana Chudadhuj.
 Mom Rajawongse Dara Jane Chudadhuj (1956)

On 24 September 1969 he married his cousin, Princess Galyani Vadhana, King Bhumibol's eldest sister. And had two concubines, Princess Kokeaw Prakaykavil na Chiang Mai and Srisalai Suchatwut.

Ancestry

References

HH Prince Varananda Dhavaj

1920 births
1990 deaths
Thai male Phra Ong Chao
Chudadhut family
Alumni of Magdalene College, Cambridge
Non-British Royal Air Force personnel of World War II
Thai people of World War II
Thai expatriates in the United Kingdom
Royal Air Force officers
Royal Air Force pilots of World War II
Royal Air Force airmen
Thai male Mom Chao
20th-century Chakri dynasty

Non-inheriting heirs presumptive